Katharine Wise Wintringham (10 February 1908 – 1966) was an American political activist, best known for her activities in the United Kingdom.

Born Kitty Bowler in Plymouth, Massachusetts, Wintringham studied at Bryn Mawr College.  There, she became involved in anti-fascist activity, joining the League Against War and Fascism and the International Labor Defense.

In 1936, Bowler travelled to Europe.  She first went to the Soviet Union, where she had a brief relationship with Walter Duranty, then to France, and on to Barcelona.  This was during the Spanish Civil War, and she met Tom Wintringham, representative of the Communist Party of Great Britain (CPGB) in the city.  Wintringham taught Bowler journalism skills, while Bowler assisted him by delivering messages and acting as his unofficial secretary.  The two fell in love, but Wintringham was already married, and the CPGB disapproved of Bowler as she was not a communist, and they considered her to be unreliable.  Bowler claimed that, when she delivered a message from Wintringham to London, she asked that they recall Wintringham, but Harry Pollitt, leader of the CPGB, responded by saying he should "go up to the front line, get himself killed to give us a headline".

Bowler returned to Spain and took on various journalistic assignments, sharing a hotel room in Valencia with Kate Mangan, who at that time was working in the Government Press Office. However, early in 1937, she was detained on the orders of André Marty on suspicion of being a spy, and expelled from the country.  Wintringham was shot in the leg the following month, and she was allowed back into Spain to help nurse him.  However, the CPGB ordered Wintringham to stop associating with Bowler, and in July she was again expelled from Spain, on this occasion returning to the United States.

Wintringham recovered from his injury, but was shot again in August, and was sent back to the UK to receive treatment.  Once he had recovered, the couple set up home together in London, leading to Wintringham's expulsion from the CPGB.  They married in 1941, once Wintringham's divorce was complete.

Kitty worked as a journalist in the UK.  She and Tom joined the left-wing 1941 Committee and were founders of its successor, the Common Wealth Party.  However, Kitty strongly disagreed with leading member Richard Acland over his advocacy of Christianity.  She stood for the party in Midlothian and Peebles Northern at the 1945 UK general election, but took only 6.4% of the votes cast.  Vincent Geoghegan considers this to be the only seat where the party put up a candidate against Labour and affected the final result, although this meant that the Conservatives won the seat.

After World War II, Kitty gave birth to a child, Benjamin, and focused on bringing him up.  Tom died suddenly in 1949 and, a few years later, Kitty moved to Hawaii, but she later returned to the UK.  She committed suicide in 1966.

References

1908 births
1966 deaths
20th-century American journalists
Bryn Mawr College alumni
Common Wealth Party politicians
People from Plymouth, Massachusetts
War correspondents of the Spanish Civil War
1966 suicides
Suicides in the United Kingdom
Women in the Spanish Civil War
American expatriates in Spain
Common Wealth Party